Lisandro López may refer to:

Lisandro López (footballer, born 1983), Argentine footballer
Lisandro López (footballer, born 1989), Argentine footballer